The Lady of Schengen (Luxembourgish: Prinzessin vu Schengen; German: Die Dame von Schengen) or the Princess of Schengen or the Lady of the Digging Pond, was a woman who lived c.2,500 years ago, and whose tomb, situated on the banks of the Moselle between Schengen and Remerschen, was discovered and excavated in 1995. It is known for its rich grave goods.

Discovery 
In 1995 the National Research Centre for Archaeology in Luxembourg undertook excavations at a site on the banks of the Moselle - between Schengen and Remerschen. She was found in what became known as grave number 17 in a cemetery. Fifty other graves, dating from the Bronze Age and the Iron Age were excavated at the same time.

Due to the acidic conditions of the soil, all of her body, apart from four teeth, had been dissolved. Based on soil and dental analysis, her age and height could be estimated and it is believed she was approximately 35 years old when she died and that she was 1.54m tall. However, she was buried with a significant assemblage of grave goods, which included: bronze bracelets, two torcs, a chiselled triangular plate, alongside other high status objects. The cremated remains of a man were also buried in the grave, between the woman's feet. Soil samples also demonstrated the presence of wood, potentially a coffin, in the grave.

Exhibition 
The jewels and a reconstruction of her tomb were on display from the end of 2018 until May 2019 at the Biodiversum in Remerschen. The exhibition featured replicas of her grave goods, as well as interactive holograms. In 2020 her tomb and its reconstruction was exhibited at Belginum Archäologiepark in Germany.

Foni Le Brun-Ricalens, Director of the National Research Centre for Archaeology, who led the excavations, concluded that the woman may have had a significant place in society; perhaps a Celtic ruler.

Further reading 

 Le Brun-Ricalens, Foni, Die Dame von Schengen - La Princesse de Schengen: Ad vitam aeternam (Archäologiepark Belginum, 2019)

References 

Schengen, Luxembourg
History of Luxembourg